The CONCACAF Gold Cup is North America's major tournament in senior men's football and determines the continental champion. Until 1989, the tournament was known as CONCACAF Championship. It is currently held every two years. From 1996 to 2005, nations from other confederations have regularly joined the tournament as invitees. In earlier editions, the continental championship was held in different countries, but since the inception of the Gold Cup in 1991, the United States are constant hosts or co-hosts.

From 1973 to 1989, the tournament doubled as the confederation's World Cup qualification. CONCACAF's representative team at the FIFA Confederations Cup was decided by a play-off between the winners of the last two tournament editions in 2015 via the CONCACAF Cup, but was then discontinued along with the Confederations Cup.

Since the inaugural tournament in 1963, the Gold Cup was held 26 times and has been won by seven different nations, most often by Mexico (11 titles).

In terms of total points earned, Trinidad and Tobago are the most successful Caribbean nation in the history of CONCACAF continental championships, but unlike Haiti, have never actually won a title. Haiti won the championship in 1973, with Trinidad and Tobago as runners-up - the closest the Trinidadians ever came to a tournament victory themselves.

Overall record

Match overview

Top goalscorers

Steve David scored seven goals during the 1973 CONCACAF Championship, which made him sole top scorer of the tournament. He is still Trinidad and Tobago's leading scorer at continental championships and the only Trinidadian to date to win an individual award.

The table ignores six goals from unknown scorers of the 1971 tournament.

References

External links
RSSSF archives and results
Soccerway database

Countries at the CONCACAF Gold Cup
Gold cup